Hopoate is a Tongan surname. Notable people with this surname include:

John Hopoate (born 1974), Australian rugby league player
Albert Hopoate (rugby league, born 1985), Australian rugby league player, younger brother of John
William Hopoate (born 1992) Australian rugby league player, son of John
Jamil Hopoate (born 1994) Australian rugby league player and convicted criminal, son of John
Albert Hopoate (rugby league, born 2001), Australian rugby league player, son of John

Tongan-language surnames